The 2004 FC Moscow season was the club's 1st season in existence after taking over the licence of Torpedo-Metallurg. They finished the season in 9th place, and reached the Round of 32 in the Russian Cup, with the Round of 16 taking place in the 2005 season.

Squad

On loan

Left club during season

Transfers

In

Out

Loans out

Released

Competitions

Premier League

Results by round

Results

League table

Russian Cup

2004–05

The Round of 16 games took place during the 2004 season.

Squad statistics

Appearances and goals

|-
|colspan="14"|Players away from the club on loan:
|-
|colspan="14"|Players who appeared for Moscow but left during the season:

|}

Goal scorers

Clean sheets

Disciplinary record

References

Moscow
FC Moscow seasons